Diego José García Moreno (born 29 July 1997), known as Diego García, is a Spanish professional footballer who plays as a midfielder.

Club career
Born in Seville, Andalusia, García finished his formation with Real Betis. He made his senior debut with the reserves on 26 April 2015, starting in a 6–0 home routing over Lucena CF in the Segunda División B championship.

On 31 January 2017, after failing to make an appearance during the first half of the campaign, García terminated his contract with Betis, and signed for city rivals Sevilla FC's C-team the following day. On 14 May, he scored his first senior goal by netting his team's second in a 2–3 Tercera División away loss against CA Antoniano.

García made his professional debut with the reserves on 13 May 2018, starting in a 1–0 home win against Gimnàstic de Tarragona in the Segunda División championship.

Notes

References

External links

Diego García at Beticopedia 

1997 births
Living people
Spanish footballers
Footballers from Seville
Association football midfielders
Segunda División players
Segunda División B players
Tercera División players
Betis Deportivo Balompié footballers
Sevilla FC C players
Sevilla Atlético players